West Blue Township, Nebraska may refer to the following places:

 West Blue Township, Adams County, Nebraska
 West Blue Township, Fillmore County, Nebraska